Siv Ericks, real name Siv Gustava Essy-Ehsing (born Eriksson 31 July 1918 in Oxelösund; died 3 July 2005 in Onsala), was a Swedish actress who performed in 66 Swedish films over a 53-year career.

Ericks began her film career with a leading role in the 1939 film Rosor varje kväll. Her work for Swedish film director Ingmar Bergman was slight; one uncredited role in A Lesson in Love (En Lektion i kärlek) (1954) and a role that ended up on the cutting room floor (Kvinnodröm, aka Dreams and Journey Into Autumn, 1955). In 1982, however, in one of her final roles, she played Alida in Bergman's Fanny and Alexander. She also had supporting roles in Pippi Longstocking (1969) and Pippi Goes on Board (1973).

Selected filmography

Rosor varje kväll (1939) - Birgit Johansson
Söderpojkar (1941) - Amy, Kalle's sister
 How to Tame a Real Man (1941) - Maud
 Poor Ferdinand (1941) - Karin Dellander
 Dangerous Ways (1942) - Green's Maid (uncredited)
Morgondagens melodi (1942)
Eviga länkar (1946) - Ms. Lindedahl - Customer (uncredited)
Two Women (1947) - Maid (uncredited)
 The Night Watchman's Wife (1947) - Waitress (uncredited)
Åsa-Nisse Goes Hunting (1950) - Greta
I dur och skur (1953) - Gustafsson
Sju svarta be-hå (1954) - Margareta Beckman
A Lesson in Love (1954) - David's Patient (uncredited)
 Simon the Sinner (1954) - Woman Drinking Coffee
 The Yellow Squadron (1954) - Actress (uncredited)
 Uncle's (1955) - Sylvia
Karusellen i fjällen (1955) - Mrs. Rosenkrans
Dreams (1955) - Katja (scenes deleted)
Den glade skomakaren (1955) - Blända Olsson
Bröderna Östermans bravader (1955) - Fru Svensson
Flicka i kasern (1955) - Edith
 A Little Nest (1956) - Emy
Egen ingång (1956) - Olga, Wardrobe Attendant (uncredited)
Seventh Heaven (1956) - Lovisas patient (uncredited)
 Night Child (1956) - Gittan
The Staffan Stolle Story (1956) - Fröken Lefverhielm
Lille Fridolf och jag (1956) - Mrs. Grillhagen
Rasmus, Pontus och Toker (1956) - Gullan Persson
 The Biscuit (1956) - Mrs. Cecilia Braxenhielm
 The Halo Is Slipping (1957) - Ms. Svensson
Bill Bergson Lives Dangerously (1957) - Mrs. Lisander
Summer Place Wanted (1957) - Miss Svensson, Secretary (uncredited)
You Are My Adventure (1958) - Marianne
 Woman in a Fur Coat (1958) - Birgitta
Musik ombord (1958) - Växeltelefonist
Enslingen i blåsväder (1959) - Astrid Lindqvist
Fly mej en greve (1959) - Siv Sluggstedt
91:an Karlsson muckar (tror han) (1959) - Mrs. Morgonkröök
Fridolfs farliga ålder (1959) - Mrs. Grillhagen
Kärlekens decimaler (1960) - Lisa Bovell
The Judge (1960) - Secretary
Svenska Floyd (1961) - Carina
En nolla för mycket (1962) - Kiddy Västerlund
Svenska bilder (1964) - Miss Larsson
Sailors (1964) - Mrs. Plunkett
Äktenskapsbrottaren (1964) - Mrs. Plunkett
Tre dar på luffen (1964) - Marietta Norén
En sån strålande dag (1967) - Ms. 'Patsy' Patricia
Pippi Longstocking (1969, TV Series) - Shop Assistant in Sweet Shop
Pippi Meia-Longa (1969) - Shop Assistant in Sweet Shop
Här kommer Pippi Långstrump (1969) - Candystore keeper in Visby
Exponerad (1971) - Jan's Mother
47:an Löken (1971) - Mrs. Örkelljung
Lockfågeln (1971) - Ulla Winbladh
Vita Nejlikan (1974) - Medium
Kom till Casino (1975)
Maria (1975) - Woman at the Hairdresser
Hello Baby (1976) - The Girl's Mother
Lyftet (1978) - Karin's Mother
Blomstrande tider (1980) - Gurli
Flight of the Eagle (1982) - Mrs. Assarsson
Fanny and Alexander (1982) - Alida - Ekdahlska huset
T. Sventon praktiserande privatdetektiv (1989, TV Series) - Faster Agda
Illusioner (1994) - Rut (final film role)

Further reading

External links 

Swedish film actresses
1918 births
2005 deaths
People from Oxelösund Municipality